Waimauku is a small locality in the Auckland Region of New Zealand. It comes under the jurisdiction of Auckland Council, and is in the council's Rodney ward. Waimauku is approximately 4 kilometres west of Huapai on State Highway 16 at the junction with the road to Muriwai Beach. Helensville is 16 km to the north-west.  Waimauku is a Māori word which is literally translated as wai: stream and mauku: varieties of small ferns.

Formerly a farming and fruit-growing community, the area around Waimauku now features a number of wineries and an increasing suburban and lifestyle farming population.

The Auckland Regional Council announced in 2007 that Western Line rail services would be extended to Helensville for a one-year trial period commencing in July 2008. This service would include a stop at Waimauku. A new station platform was built at Waimauku and the service commenced on 14 July 2008. The service ceased in 2009, and the platform is currently unused.

History 

The area is in the traditional rohe of Te Kawerau ā Maki. The name Waimauku describes the banks of the Kaipara River near the modern settlement, and how when they flooded only tī mauku (cabbage trees) would be visible.

Demographics

Waimauku had a population of 1,338 at the 2018 New Zealand census, an increase of 165 people (14.1%) since the 2013 census, and an increase of 324 people (32.0%) since the 2006 census. There were 426 households, comprising 666 males and 669 females, giving a sex ratio of 1.0 males per female. The median age was 40.4 years (compared with 37.4 years nationally), with 294 people (22.0%) aged under 15 years, 216 (16.1%) aged 15 to 29, 660 (49.3%) aged 30 to 64, and 165 (12.3%) aged 65 or older.

Ethnicities were 93.7% European/Pākehā, 11.0% Māori, 3.4% Pacific peoples, 4.5% Asian, and 1.8% other ethnicities. People may identify with more than one ethnicity.

The percentage of people born overseas was 22.0, compared with 27.1% nationally.

Although some people chose not to answer the census's question about religious affiliation, 61.0% had no religion, 30.5% were Christian, 1.1% were Hindu, 0.4% were Buddhist and 1.3% had other religions.

Of those at least 15 years old, 234 (22.4%) people had a bachelor's or higher degree, and 135 (12.9%) people had no formal qualifications. The median income was $45,400, compared with $31,800 nationally. 312 people (29.9%) earned over $70,000 compared to 17.2% nationally. The employment status of those at least 15 was that 588 (56.3%) people were employed full-time, 174 (16.7%) were part-time, and 18 (1.7%) were unemployed.

Marae

The local Reweti Marae is affiliated with the Ngāti Whātua o Kaipara and Ngāti Whātua hapū of Te Taoū. It features Whiti te Rā meeting house.

Governance 
Waimauku is part of the Local Government Rodney Ward of Auckland Council and is part of the Kumeu Subdivision of the Rodney Local Board.

Waimauku is in the Kaipara ki Mahurangi electorate. (Previously Helensville electorate.)

Economy 

The township is in the North West Country Inc business improvement district zone. The business association which represents businesses from Kaukapakapa to Riverhead.

Education

The local secondary school is Kaipara College.

References

External links
 Waimauku School website

Rodney Local Board Area
Populated places in the Auckland Region
Populated places on the Kaipara River
West Auckland, New Zealand